Mici Haraszti (Born Mária Hinkelmann; 25 June 1882, in Trencsén, Austria-Hungary (now Trenčín, Slovakia) – 18 February 1964, in Budapest, Hungary) was a Hungarian actress.

Selected filmography
 The Officer's Swordknot (1915)
 Hyppolit, the Butler (1931)
 Everything for the Woman (1934)
 I May See Her Once a Week (1937)
 Dr. Kovács István (1942)
 Afrikai völegény (1944)

Bibliography
 Kulik, Karol. Alexander Korda: The Man Who Could Work Miracles. Virgin Books, 1990.

External links

1882 births
1964 deaths
People from Trenčín
Hungarian film actresses
Hungarian silent film actresses
20th-century Hungarian actresses
Hungarian stage actresses